The 1967 Houston Cougars baseball team represented the University of Houston in the 1967 NCAA University Division baseball season. The Cougars played their home games at the original Cougar Field. The team was coached by Lovette Hill in his 18th season at Houston.

The Cougars lost the College World Series, defeated by the Arizona State Sun Devils in the championship game.

Roster

Schedule and results

Schedule Source:

Awards and honors 
Ike Lucas
All Tournament Team

Tom Paciorek
All Tournament Team
AACBC First Team All-America Team

References

Houston
Houston Cougars baseball seasons
Houston Cougars baseball
College World Series seasons